Amalda northlandica, common name the Northland olive, is a medium-sized sea snail, a gastropod mollusc in the family Ancillariidae, the olives.

References

External links
 Amalda northlandica photo
 Tepapa photo
 Description

northlandica
Gastropods of New Zealand
Gastropods described in 1995